"Heavy" is a song by American post-grunge band Collective Soul. It is the second single from their fourth album Dosage. It was the last of the band's seven number ones on Billboard's Hot Mainstream Rock Tracks, as well as their most successful, staying atop the chart for 15 weeks. It was also their last song to chart on the Billboard Hot 100, peaking at number 73. It was featured as one of two songs in NHL 2001.

Composition

In a December 2017 interview with Songfacts, lead singer Ed Roland explained the inspiration behind "Heavy". Referencing Collective Soul's earlier hit, "December", he said:

Personnel
Ed Roland- Lead Vocals, Rhythm Guitar
Ross Childress- Lead Guitar 
Shane Evans- Drums 
Dean Roland- Rhythm Guitar
Will Turpin- Bass, Backing Vocals

Chart performance

Weekly charts

Year-end charts

References

1999 singles
1999 songs
Atlantic Records singles
Collective Soul songs
Songs written by Ed Roland